Sandra Sully (born 18 February 1965) is an Australian news presenter and journalist and editor for 10 News First in Sydney and Queensland.

Sully attended Brisbane State High School, graduating in 1978.

Life and career

Sully was the first Australian television journalist to cover news of the 11 September terrorist attacks. She was on air when the first attack occurred and, shortly afterwards, began presenting live breaking coverage.

She also hosted Cool Aid Australia's National Carbon Test.

She was the first woman to co-host the broadcast of the Melbourne Cup carnival and did so for seven years.

In June 2013, Sully and a fellow Channel Ten journalist, Matt Doran, headed a new police crime program on Monday nights called Wanted, where she also did interviews with victims' loved ones to appeal for the public to help solve the case by calling Crimestoppers.

As of 2018, Sully presents 10 News First Sydney. Sully presented Ten Eyewitness News Brisbane in the 1990s, where she originally started out, before presenting Ten's flagship Sydney 5:00 pm weeknight bulletin.

Since September 2020, Sully has also presented the Queensland bulletin, produced from Sydney, as part of a shake-up to the 10 News First brand.

Television

Personal life
Sully was the victim of an apparent stalker in November 1997. She was pistol-whipped twice in the carpark of her home after returning from a late shift at Ten. At an awards ceremony in late 2006, she told guests she had hired "a couple of security guards" following the incident.

Sully married in 2011, becoming stepmother to her husband's adopted daughter.

References

External links

 
 Sandra Sully Biography Ten Eyewitness News 

10 News First presenters
Australian television journalists
People educated at Brisbane State High School
Australian game show hosts
1965 births
Living people
People from Brisbane